K. Mohanakrishnan (14 March 1926 – 24 August 2014) also known as Pasamalar Mohan, or simply K. Mohan, was an Indian film producer and art director who worked mainly in Tamil cinema. Mohan worked for various films and companies since 1951. He was the producer for the Tamil film Pasamalar (1961).

Family and early life 
Mohan was born into a Tamil family in Chennai. His father, T. Kannabiran Mudhaliyar, was the Madras High court Magistrate and General Manager of five theatres (Prabhat Talkies, Broadway Talkies, Murugan, Mahalakshmi, Saraswati). His mother Indirani Ammal died in his earlier ages. Mohan took Art as his passion and started drawing and painting various images. In 1951, he married his wife, Shantakumari.

Career 
While still a student, Mohan began creating film banners for the film Kulaebagavali. In 1950, Mohan established Mohan Arts, a firm that specialized in the creation of promotional materials for films such as banners and cut-outs. The  cutout for Vanangamudi in 1957 won various appreciations. His cutouts of Queen Elizabeth II during her visit to Chennai attracted the entire city and the queen herself thanked and appreciated him personally. His works for the film Gandhi won him nationwide attention. Actor Sivakumar started his art career under his guidance and in his company. Mohan was also an art director and won various statewide and national awards for excellence, including the "Vikas Ratna" awarded presented by the Government of India for the field of art. He has won consecutive awards for the category ‘publicity’ by all the state cinema award function.

Personal life 
Mohan died on 24 August 2014, three years after his wife. The couple had five sons, three daughters and 13 grandchildren. Two of Mohan's sons, Harinath Kumar and Narendran, inherited and continue to run Mohan Arts.

References 

1926 births
2014 deaths
Film producers from Chennai
Indian art directors
Tamil film producers